Lestoidea is a superfamily of damselflies of the order Odonata.

Note 
It is important to distinguish the genus Lestoidea from superfamily Lestoidea. They have the same spelling, but the superfamily is based on the genus Lestes.

See also 
 List of damselflies of the world

References

Taxa named by Philip Powell Calvert
Insects described in 1901
Insect superfamilies